The X-200 was a United States incendiary landmine locally improvised during the Korean War.

The X-200 consisted of a salvaged  oil can filled with napalm and fitted with a black powder bursting charge. The mine was either command-detonated or set off by trip wires. The mines were widely deployed with a report from March 1952 stating that over 11,000 had been produced and 800 had been issued that month.

External links
 US Army document describing the mine

Land mines of the United States
Incendiary weapons